Aubach is a river of Mecklenburg-Vorpommern, Germany. It flows into the Pfaffenteich, which is drained by the Stör, in Schwerin.

See also
List of rivers of Mecklenburg-Vorpommern

Rivers of Mecklenburg-Western Pomerania
Rivers of Germany

References